Lake El Paso is a privately owned lake that was once an entertainment venue for the city of El Paso. The land is now closed to the public due to the inherent dangers of an empty lake and the desert environment. It is currently up for sale by its owners.

1996 establishments in Texas
2004 disestablishments in Texas
El Paso
Tourist attractions in El Paso County, Texas
El Paso
El Paso